Babatunde Omidina (22 August 1958 – 22 November 2021) was a Nigerian actor and comedian popularly known as Baba Suwe.

Early life 
Baba Suwe was born on 22 August 1958, in Inabere Street in Lagos Island where he grew up but hailed from Ikorodu local government area of Lagos State, southwestern Nigeria.

Omidina had his primary education at Jamaitul Islamia Primary School in Lagos and Children Boarding School, Osogbo before he proceeded to Adekanbi Commercial High School in  Mile 12, Lagos state but obtained the West African School Certificate from Ifeoluwa Grammar School in Osogbo, the capital of Osun State, southwestern Nigeria.

Career 
Omidina began acting in 1971 but came into the limelight after he featured in a movie titled, Omolasan, a film produced by Obalende.
He became more popular after he featured in Iru Esin, produced by Olaiya Igwe in 1997.
He had featured in and produced several Nigerian movies such as Baba Jaiye jaiye, a movie that featured Funke Akindele and Femi Adebayo, the son of the veteran actor Adebayo Salami.
In 2011, he was accused of cocaine trafficking by the National Drug Law Enforcement Agency, an allegation that was described as false and defamatory by the ruling of the Lagos high court of law.
His solicitor was the late Bamidele Aturu, a Nigerian lawyer and human rights activist.

Death 
Omidina died on 22 November 2021.

Filmography 
Oluweri Magboojo
Ba o ku
Oju Oloju
Baba Londoner
Ko tan si be
Aso Ibora
Obelomo
elebolo""
 Larinloodu''

See also 
List of Yoruba people

References

External links 
 

1958 births
2021 deaths
Nigerian male film actors
Yoruba male actors
Male actors from Lagos
Nigerian male comedians
Male actors in Yoruba cinema
20th-century Nigerian male actors
21st-century Nigerian male actors
Yoruba comedians
Nigerian male television actors
20th-century births